Annaheim is an iron meteorite recovered in 1916 in Canada.

History
The meteorite was discovered by a farmer named William Huiras in his field while moving hay. It was linked to a fireball reported in the area in 1914.

Classification
It is a medium octahedrite, IAB-sLL.

Fragment
The crescent-shaped fragment is covered in dimples as is typical with other iron meteorites.

See also
 Glossary of meteoritics

References

External links
Encyclopedia of Meteoritea: Annaheim

Meteorites found in Canada
1914 in Canada